Lech Kulwicki (born 2 November 1951) was a Polish footballer who played as a defender. He played for five teams in the Pomeranian region, ending his playing career by spending 5 seasons in Australia.

Football

Early years
Born in Tczew, Kulwicki started his playing career with the youth sides of local team Unia Tczew. He made his Unia and professional debut on 17 August 1969 in a game against Olimpia Elbląg. After one season with Unia, Kulwicki joined Flota Gdynia for two seasons before joining Polonia Gdańsk, where he spent a total of five seasons. In his first season with Polonia Kulwicki was part of the team who won promotion to the second division and playing half of the 1976–77 season where the team finished third, and narrowly missed out on promotion to the top division, the club's highest ever finish in the Polish leagues.

Lechia Gdańsk
In 1977 he moved to Lechia Gdańsk, where he spent his most successful spell of his career. The first 5 seasons spent at Lechia was playing in the second division and during this time Kulwicki played 132 games and scored 5 goals. In 1981–82 Lechia were relegated to the third tier, and saw a resurgence in fortunes. The 1982–83 season saw Lechia winning the III liga and played in every game as Lechia won the Polish Cup for the first time. The following season Lechia won the Polish SuperCup by beating the Polish champions, Lech Poznań 1-0. Later that season Lechia faced European footballing giants Juventus in a European competition due to the previous season's cup win. Kulwicki was the captain for the away game as Juventus won the two-legged tie 10-2 on aggregate. Lechia also won promotion to the top division that season by winning the II liga for the 1983–84 season. His final season with Lechia was in the I liga, where he made 19 appearances in the top division. In total he played 213 games and scored 6 goals in all competitions for Lechia Gdańsk.

Later years
After Lechia he played a season with Wisła Tczew before spending five years in Australia with Polonia Sydney. After his playing career he returned to Lechia Gdańsk where he became assistant managers for Janusz Kupcewicz, Jerzy Jastrzębowski, and Romuald Szukiełowicz. In 2000 Kulwicki became the assistant manager for Wiesław Wika at Lechia-Polonia Gdańsk for a week. He later went on to become manager of Wisła Tczew, Unia Tczew, Orła Trąbki Wielkie and Motławy Suchy Dąb.

Personal life

Kulwicki is commemorated by a star at the MOSiR Stadium in Gdańsk. The "Avenue of Stars" commemorates the efforts and success of former players and coaches.

Honours

Polonia Gdańsk

II liga (northern group)
Third-place: 1976–77
III liga (group IV)
Winners: 1972–73

Lechia Gdańsk

Polish Cup
Winners: 1983
Polish SuperCup
Winners: 1983
II liga (western group)
Winners: 1983–84
III liga (group II)
Winners: 1982–83

Wisła Tczew

III liga (group II)
Third-place: 1985–86

References 

1951 births
Living people
People from Tczew
Sportspeople from Pomeranian Voivodeship
Polish footballers
Unia Tczew players
Polonia Gdańsk players
Lechia Gdańsk players
Lechia Gdańsk managers
Polish football managers
Association football defenders